Eucalyptus atrata, commonly known as the Herberton ironbark or blue-leaved ironbark, is a small tree that is endemic to Queensland. It has hard, black "ironbark" on the trunk and all but the thinnest branches, lance-shaped adult leaves, buds usually arranged in groups of seven, white flowers and cup-shaped to hemispherical fruit. It is characterised by the blue-grey, powdery bloom on its leaves and flower buds.

Description
Only the thinnest branches have smooth cream-coloured or brown bark. Its leaves and flower buds are covered with a bluish grey, powdery bloom. The flower buds are usually arranged in group of seven in leaf axils or on the ends of the branches. Flowering mainly occurs from December to February and the flowers are white.

Taxonomy and naming
Eucalyptus atrata was first formally described in 1991 by Lawrie Johnston and Ken Hill from a specimen collected by Donald Blaxell near Irvinebank. The specific epithet (atrata) is a Latin word meaning "dressed in black", referring to the dark bark.

Distribution and habitat
Herberton ironbark grows in grassy woodland or forest in scattered locations on and near the Atherton Tableland in Queensland, especially in the area bounded by Herberton, Irvinebank and Mareeba.

Conservation
This eucalypt is classed as "not threatened" under the Queensland Government Nature Conservation Act 1992.

See also
List of Eucalyptus species

References

Trees of Australia
atrata
Myrtales of Australia
Flora of Queensland
Taxa named by Lawrence Alexander Sidney Johnson
Taxa named by Ken Hill (botanist)